Washington Institute may refer to:

Washington Institute for Near East Policy
Washington Institute for Values in Public Policy 
Washington Institute in Saint Louis

See also
Booker Washington Institute
Lake Washington Institute of Technology
Washington State Institute for Public Policy